Crocus carpetanus  is a species of flowering plant in the Iridaceae family. It is native to Portugal and Spain.

References

External links
 
 

carpetanus
Plants described in 1842
Taxa named by Pierre Edmond Boissier
Taxa named by George François Reuter
Endemic flora of the Iberian Peninsula
Flora of Portugal
Flora of Spain